Akbarabad (also Romanized as Akbarābād) is a village in Fazl Rural District, Zarrin Dasht District, Nahavand County, Hamadan Province, Iran. At the 2006 census, its population was 127, in 29 families.

References 

Populated places in Nahavand County